Kranji Reservoir Park is a 9 hectares park located next to Kranji Reservoir along Kranji Way in Singapore. It overlooks Johor Straits and is a favourite hotspot among fishing enthusiasts and weekend picnickers. Facilities include two fishing grounds, pavilions and benches. The park's two fishing grounds A and B are opened from 7am to 7pm daily. A war memorial plaque at the park serves to honor the brave soldiers who died while doing their line of duty in World War II during the Battle of Kranji.

See also
List of parks in Singapore

References

External links
Kranji Reservoir Park at National Parks Board

Parks in Singapore